Henry Calvin Johnson Jr. (born October 2, 1954) is an American lawyer and politician serving as the U.S. representative for  since 2007. He is a member of the Democratic Party. The district is anchored in Atlanta's inner eastern suburbs, including Decatur, Conyers, Lithonia, Lilburn and a sliver of Atlanta itself. Johnson is one of only three Buddhists to have served in the United States Congress. The others are Senator Mazie Hirono and former Representative Colleen Hanabusa, both of Hawaii.

Life, education, and career
Johnson grew up in Washington, D.C. His father worked for the Bureau of Prisons and was the director of classifications and paroles. Up to that time, he was the highest ranking African-American in the bureau.

Johnson received his B.A. degree from Clark College (now Clark Atlanta University) in 1976, is a member of Omega Psi Phi Kappa Alpha Alpha Chapter, Decatur, Georgia, and received his J.D. degree from Texas Southern University Thurgood Marshall School of Law in Houston in 1979; he practiced law in Decatur, Georgia, for more than 25 years.

From 1989 to 2001, Johnson served as an associate judge of the DeKalb County magistrate's court. He was elected to the DeKalb County Commission in 2000 and served from 2001 to 2006.

U.S. House of Representatives

Elections

2006

In 2006, Johnson challenged Representative Cynthia McKinney in the Democratic primary for the 4th district—the real contest in this heavily Democratic, black-majority district. He forced McKinney into a runoff by holding her under 50% in the July 18 primary: McKinney got 47.1% of the vote; Johnson 44.4%, and a third candidate 8.5%.

In the August 8 runoff, although there were about 8,000 more voters, McKinney got about the same number of votes as in the July primary. Johnson won with 41,178 votes (59%) to McKinney's 28,832 (41%).

On October 6, 2006, Congressional Quarterly'''s "On Their Way", which features promising candidates soon to arrive in Washington, featured Johnson.

In November, Johnson defeated the Republican nominee, Catherine Davis, with 76% of the vote—one of the largest percentages for a Democrat in a contested election, and the largest in the district's history. But he had effectively assured himself of a seat in Congress by winning the primary: with a Cook Partisan Voting Index of D+22, the 4th was the second-most Democratic district in Georgia (only the neighboring 5th, covering most of Atlanta, was more Democratic).

Johnson made aggressive use of the internet to court supporters and attract national attention to his primary challenge to McKinney. The National Journal wrote that of all Congressional candidates nationwide in 2006, "Johnson had the most unique blog strategy by far." The National Journal ranked Johnson's use of the internet to defeat McKinney—and the broader trend of challengers using the blogosphere to challenge entrenched incumbents—as the third most significant blog-related story of 2006. Johnson was the first Congressional candidate invited to blog for The Hill's Congress Blog, typically reserved for members of Congress. "I'm tremendously excited about the opportunity to use this unique medium to strengthen democracy by increasing open interaction between constituents and candidates," Johnson wrote. "I hope to provide you with an inside view of this contested, high stakes runoff."

2008

Johnson was unopposed for reelection in 2008, winning 99.9% of the vote against write-in candidates Loren Christopher Collins, Faye Coffield and Jacob Perasso.

On July 30, 2007, Johnson was the first Democratic congressman in Georgia to publicly endorse Barack Obama in the 2008 Democratic presidential primary.

2010

Johnson was reelected over the Republican nominee, business owner Liz Carter, receiving 131,760 of 176,467 votes, or 74.67%. Carter, who is white, made headlines during the campaign by maintaining that she had been initially barred from appearing at a candidate forum hosted by Newsmakers Journal due to her race, an assertion the forum's organizers denied.

2012
On November 4, 2012, Johnson won an uncontested general election.

2014
On November 4, 2014, Johnson won an uncontested general election.

2016
On November 8, 2016, Johnson won reelection over Republican Victor Armendariz.

2018
On November 6, 2018, Johnson won reelection over Republican Joe Profit.

2020
On November 3, 2020, Johnson won reelection over Republican Johsie Ezammudeen.

2022
On November 8, 2022, Johnson won reelection over Republican Jonathan Chavez.

Tenure
On November 18, 2008, the Democratic Caucus elected Johnson Regional Whip for the Eighth Region (GA, FL, MS, AL, U.S. Virgin Islands).

Iraq War
On January 25, 2007, Johnson responded to U.S. President George W. Bush's State of the Union address by criticizing the war in Iraq, saying, "This war has proven to be one of the gravest missteps in the recent history of our country. It is time for President Bush to face the music and respond to the urgent demands of a frustrated country."

On February 8, 2007, Johnson introduced his first bill: a resolution requesting that the Secretary of Defense Robert Gates take U.S. troops off of street patrol duty in Iraq. "There is no military solution for the civil war in Iraq", Johnson said. "It is time for Iraqi troops, who have been trained, to assume responsibility for patrolling their own streets. Clearly, deploying our troops this way has only escalated the number of U.S. casualties, and this must stop". According to the Atlanta Journal-Constitution, Johnson's resolution was "interesting in that it goes beyond broad directives and proposes something very specific".

On March 23, 2007, Johnson voted to pass H.R. 1591 and attracted attention by blogging about his decision to vote for it. H.R. 1591 passed the House on March 23, 2007, and the Senate on April 26, but Bush, citing the Iraqi withdrawal timeline among the many particulars as being unacceptable, vetoed the bill on May 1; Congress tried to override the veto the next day but was unable to garner the votes. On May 24, 2007, Johnson voted to cut funding for the Iraq War unless provisions included binding requirements upon the Iraqi government. On May 25, 2007, a compromise bill, the U.S. Troop Readiness, Veterans' Care, Katrina Recovery, and Iraq Accountability Appropriations Act, 2007, was enacted.

Israel
Johnson has been a critic of Israel's occupation policies and has not altered his stance despite criticism.

On July 25, 2016, in a speech in Philadelphia before the U.S. Campaign to End the Israeli Occupation, Johnson said that the Israel occupation of the West Bank had created highways to which Palestinians are denied access, and which cut off Palestinian neighborhoods from each other; that walls and Israeli checkpoints restrict Palestinian freedom of movement; that Jewish people take homes when Palestinian residents miss spending a night there, and fly an Israeli flag, while Palestinians are not permitted to fly their own. He was also purported to have said Palestinian homes were stolen or destroyed. He added that "there is a steady [stream], almost like termites" and that "settlement activity has marched forwards with impunity"."There Is No Excuse for Anti-Semitic Smears" By Rabbi David Wolpe July 26, 2016 Time

The remark was picked up by Adam Kredo for The Washington Free Beacon, who reported Johnson as having likened Jewish Israelis in the West Bank to termites.Yakov Hirsch, 'Using Rep. Johnson’s innocent comment to stain his reputation was the real crime,' Mondoweiss  31 July 31, 2016. The Anti-Defamation League cited the words as an example of "demonization, dehumanization of settlers". Dov Wilker of the American Jewish Committee was reported as saying Johnson had compared Jewish Israelis to "vermin" and was using a centuries-old anti-Semitic trope. Rabbi David Wolpe called it an anti-Semitic smear and questioned Johnson's apology, writing, "'I am sorry I said something stupid and anti-Semitic'—that would have been a fitting apology".

Johnson apologized on Twitter for his "poor choice of words" but added that Israeli settlements were undermining the two-state solution. In a statement his office made to The Atlanta Journal-Constitution, he clarified that his termite metaphor referred to the corrosive process of settlement policies, "not the people".Jessica Chasmar,   Rep. Hank Johnson apologizes for comparing West Bank settlements to ‘termites’ Washington Times 26 July 2016. J Street responded to Johnson's clarification by stating there should be no place for slurs, but, in their view, Johnson was speaking of the settlement enterprise, not of individuals. Media coverage, they added, should focus on opposition to settlement growth rather than on the misrepresentations by an irresponsible media outlet.

Wilker held several meetings with Johnson to foster greater understanding and communication. In 2018, Johnson accepted his invitation to attend a vigil at Shearith Israel in the aftermath of the Pittsburgh synagogue shooting for a national initiative called #ShowUpForShabbat. In 2019, Johnson appeared at the American Jewish Committee's National Board of Governors Institute "Conversations With Congress" where the group told Johnson: "we were obviously grateful when you apologized for a previous comment a few years back that was unintentionally anti-Semitic and how you handled it so well with the Atlanta Jewish community, how can we better educate members of Congress and others about these problematic tropes."

Civil justice
Johnson has supported legislation aimed at strengthening the U.S. civil justice system. In March 2016, he and Representative John Conyers introduced legislation to protect consumers access to civil courts, the Restoring Statutory Rights Act. The legislation would "ensure that the state, federal, and constitutional rights of Americans are enforceable" and that consumers are not forced into secretive private arbitration hearings.

Economic positions
Johnson voted against the Troubled Asset Relief Program (TARP) bailout bill in November 2008. He voted for the Recovery and Reinvestment Act of 2009, the stimulus package supported by Democrats in Congress and President Obama.

In 2007, Johnson's H.Con.Res.80, a resolution calling for peaceful resolution to the Ugandan civil war between the Government of Uganda and the Lord's Resistance Army, unanimously passed the House and Senate. His first successful piece of legislation, it was jointly introduced in the Senate by Senators Russ Feingold and Sam Brownback.

Joe Wilson
In 2009, Johnson demanded censure of Representative Joe Wilson after Wilson shouted "you lie" during Obama's speech to a joint session of the 111th United States Congress on September 9, 2009, about his plan for health care reform; Johnson argued that the comment had an unseen racial undertone and that, if Wilson was not formally rebuked, "we will have people with white hoods running through the countryside again".

Comments on Guam tipping over
During a March 25, 2010, House Armed Services Committee hearing about the U.S. military installation in Guam, Johnson said to Admiral Robert F. Willard, Commander of U.S. Pacific Command, "My fear is that the whole island will become so overly populated that it will tip over and capsize", to which Willard replied, "We don't anticipate that." The next day, Johnson's office claimed that he was tremendously deadpan and had used a facetious metaphor to draw attention to the potential negative impact of adding 8,000 Marines and dependents to an island of 180,000 people.

Effectiveness in Congress
In 2014, Johnson was named the 18th most effective Democrat in the 112th Congress according to a study by Vanderbilt University and the University of Virginia (UVA). He was also ranked higher than any of his Republican colleagues from Georgia. The study judged effectiveness by looking at a lawmaker's "proven ability to advance a member's agenda items through the legislative process and into law." The scorecard looked at the number of bills a member introduced or sponsored, the bills' significance, and how far each made it in the legislative process.

Impeachments
Johnson was a member of the United States House Judiciary Task Force on Judicial Impeachment, a task force of the House Judiciary Committee created in 2008. The task force carried out impeachment inquiries into Judges Thomas Porteous and Samuel B. Kent. In 2009, Johnson was in the unanimous majority voting to adopt all four articles of impeachment against Kent. All House members participating in the vote voted in favor of each article, with the exception of one member who voted "present" on the fourth article. Johnson was thereafter appointed and served as an impeachment manager (prosecutor) for Kent's impeachment trial. In 2010, he also voted in the unanimous majority that approved all four articles of impeachment against Porteous. He was also appointed and served as an impeachment manager for Porteous's impeachment trial.

On September 24, 2019, Johnson called for the impeachment of President Donald Trump due to the Trump-Ukraine scandal. This was the same day that the related impeachment inquiry was launched. Johnson sat on the House Committee on the Judiciary, which played a significant role in the inquiry. When the committee voted on approving articles of impeachment against Trump to be forwarded to the full House, Johnson voted in favor of approving both articles. In the full House vote on the adoption of the two articles of impeachment against Trump, Johnson voted with the majority to adopt them and thereby approve the first impeachment of Trump. In 2021, he voted for the adoption of sole article of impeachment against Trump in his second impeachment.

Washingtonian "Best & Worst" of 2014
On October 5, 2014 The Washingtonian'' published its 15th biennial "Best & Worst of Congress" list. Johnson was voted "Most Clueless" by congressional staffers.

Committee assignments
Transportation & Infrastructure 
Subcommittee on Highways & Transit
Subcommittee on Economic Development, Public Buildings and Emergency Management
Committee on the Judiciary
Subcommittee on Courts, Commercial and Administrative Law
Subcommittee on Courts, Intellectual Property and the Internet (Chair)
Subcommittee on Crime, Terrorism, and Homeland Security

Caucus memberships
 Congressional Progressive Caucus
 Congressional Black Caucus
 Congressional Freethought Caucus
 Congressional Arts Caucus
 U.S.-Japan Caucus
 Medicare for All Caucus
 Tom Lantos Human Rights Commission

Personal life
Johnson is married to attorney Mereda Davis Johnson; they have two children.

In December 2009, Johnson revealed that he had been battling Hepatitis C (HCV) for over a decade, which resulted in slow speech and a tendency to regularly get "lost in thought in the middle of a discussion". He said he learned he had the disease in 1998 but did not know how he contracted it. HCV-induced liver dysfunction often leads to hepatic encephalopathy, a cause of confusion. Symptoms are often reversible with treatment. The disease damaged his liver and led to thyroid problems. He was treated with a combination of ribavirin and interferon at Walter Reed Army Medical Center. In February 2010, Johnson successfully completed an experimental treatment for Hepatitis C, which resulted in restored mental acuity, weight gain and increased energy.

See also
List of African-American United States representatives
List of Buddhist members of the United States Congress

References

External links

Congressman Hank Johnson official U.S. House website
Hank Johnson for Congress

 

|-

1954 births
21st-century American politicians
American Buddhists
African-American members of the United States House of Representatives
African-American people in Georgia (U.S. state) politics
Clark Atlanta University alumni
Converts to Sōka Gakkai
Members of Sōka Gakkai
Democratic Party members of the United States House of Representatives from Georgia (U.S. state)
Living people
Nichiren Buddhists
People from Decatur, Georgia
People from Lithonia, Georgia
People from Washington, D.C.
Thurgood Marshall School of Law alumni
Buddhism in Georgia (U.S. state)
21st-century African-American politicians
20th-century African-American people